Andrew Rawlin (born 14 July 1960) is a British cross-country skier. He competed in the men's 30 kilometre event at the 1984 Winter Olympics.

References

External links
 

1960 births
Living people
British male cross-country skiers
Olympic cross-country skiers of Great Britain
Cross-country skiers at the 1984 Winter Olympics
Sportspeople from Sheffield